Stephen H. Norwood is a  professor of history at the University of Oklahoma.   He received his PhD at Columbia University in 1984.

Norwood's 2009 book The Third Reich in the Ivory Tower: Complicity and Conflict on American Campuses, drew  attention even before publication. According to Norwood, "Harvard was involved in active steps that helped legitimate the Nazi regime in the West", and was "indifferent to the prosecution of German Jews and indeed on numerous occasions assisted the Nazis in their efforts to gain acceptance in the West", welcoming one of Adolf Hitler's closest deputies to a reunion, hosting a reception for German naval officials and sending delegates to a celebration at a German university that had expelled Jews, while failing to condemn the policies of Hitler's regime.

Norwood's most recent book is Antisemitism and the American Far Left. This is the first systematic study of the American far-left's role in both promoting and combating antisemitism. The book covers both the Old Left and New Left, including the latter's black nationalist allies. It also examines the antisemitism of the contemporary far-left, including its relationships with Islamists.

Books

Awards
 Herbert G. Gutman Award in American Social History, 1990
 SABR/Macmillan Award
 Finalist, National Jewish Book Award for Holocaust Studies, 2009

See also
 Rose Finkelstein Norwood

References

External links
Voices on Antisemitism Interview with Stephen H. Norwood from the U.S. Holocaust Memorial Museum

Year of birth missing (living people)
Living people
University of Oklahoma faculty
Historians of the Holocaust
Columbia University alumni
21st-century American historians
21st-century American male writers
American male non-fiction writers